Menteşe is a planned district and second level municipality in Muğla Province, Turkey. According to the 2012 Metropolitan Municipalities Law (law no. 6360), all Turkish provinces with a population more than 750,000 will become metropolitan municipalities and the districts within the metropolitan municipalities  will be second level municipalities. The law also creates new districts within the provinces in addition to present districts. These changes will be effective by the local elections in 2014.

Thus after 2014 the present Muğla central district will be named Menteşe and the name Muğla will be reserved for the metropolitan municipality. (Menteşe was the name of a 14th-century beylik in and around Muğla Province.)

Rural area
There were four towns and 48 villages in the rural area of Menteşe. Now their official became "neighborhood of Menteşe".

References

Menteşe District